The Pleasant Grove Town Hall is a historic former city hall in Pleasant Grove, Utah, United States, that is listed on the National Register of Historic Places.

Description
The building is located at 107 South 100 East, within the Pleasant Grove Historic District, and was built in 1887.

In 1985 it was the second oldest and the best preserved public building in Pleasant Grove, and is one of about a dozen well-preserved buildings constructed of locally quarried soft, tufa rock in the town. Although originally built as a town hall, it was later used for other purposes including, from 1962, as town library.

It was listed on the National Register of Historic Places June 27, 1985.

See also

 National Register of Historic Places listings in Utah County, Utah

References

External links

City and town halls on the National Register of Historic Places in Utah
Greek Revival architecture in Utah
Government buildings completed in 1887
Buildings and structures in Pleasant Grove, Utah
National Register of Historic Places in Utah County, Utah
City and town halls in Utah
Individually listed contributing properties to historic districts on the National Register in Utah